Donggang Subdistrict is a subdistrict in Chengguan District, Lanzhou, Gansu Province, China.

Located near downtown Lanzhou, and at the eastern entrance to the city, is it home to many state-owned enterprises, colleges and universities and logistics businesses.

Administrative divisions 
The sub-district governs 5 residential communities and 4 administrative villages.

 Shengouqiao community
 Yan'erwan community
 Zhenxing community
 Xinxing community
 Taoshuping community

Transportation
The area is served by Line 1 of the Lanzhou Metro.

References

Subdistricts of the People's Republic of China